Otto Kade (6 May 1819 – 19 July 1900) was a German musicologist, organist, conductor and composer.

Life and career 
Kade was born in Dresden. After graduating from the Kreuzschule, Kade studied harmony and counterpoint with the Kreuzkantor  and Moritz Hauptmann in Dresden. With the support of his uncle, the coin engraver Reinhard Krüger, he could make a one-and-a-half year journey to Italy, on which he researched in music archives and among other things tracked down a mass by Giovanni Pierluigi da Palestrina in a monastery library and brought it into a score.

Kade died in Doberan at age 81.

Publications 
 Cantionale für die evangelisch-lutherischen Kirchen des Großherzogtums Mecklenburg-Schwerin. 4 volumes, 1868–1887.
 Vierstimmiges Choralbuch für Kirche, Schule und Haus zu dem auf Grossherzoglichen Befehl 1867 erschienenen Melodieenbuche zu dem Mecklenburgischen Kirchengesangbuche. 1869.
 Der neuaufgefundene Luther-Codex vom Jahre 1530. 1871.
 Die fünfundzwanzigjährige Wirksamkeit des grossherzoglichen Schlosschores in Schwerin. Eine Festschrift. Schwerin: Sandmeyer 1880
 (editor) August Wilhelm Ambros: Geschichte der Musik. 5 volume, 1880–1882
 Die Musikalien-Sammlung des Großherzoglich Mecklenburg-Schwerinschen Fürstenhauses in den letzten zwei Jahrhunderten. 2 volumes, 1893.
 Digitalisat von Band I on Internet Archive
 Digitalisat von Band II on Internet Archive
 [addendum] Der musikalische Nachlaß weiland Ihrer Königlichen Hoheit der verwitweten Frau Erbgrossherzogin Landgravine Auguste of Hesse-Homburg. Wismar, Schwerin 1899 [repr. Hildesheim, New York 1974] 
 Die alteren Musikalien der Stadt Freiberg in Sachsen. Edited by von Reinhard Kade. Leipzig: Breitkopf & Härtel 1888 (Beilage zu den Monatsheften für Musik-Geschichte).
 Die ältere Passionskomposition bis zum Jahre 1631. Gütersloh 1893.

Further reading 
 Reinhard Kade: Otto Kade †. In: Monatshefte für Musikgeschichte 32 (1900), 169–172

External links 
 

1819 births
1900 deaths
Musicians from Dresden
German classical organists
19th-century classical musicians
19th-century organists
19th-century German musicologists